The Hellenic Football League, currently known as the Uhlsport Hellenic Football League for sponsorship reasons, is an English men's football league covering an area including the English counties of  Gloucestershire, Oxfordshire, southern Buckinghamshire, southern Herefordshire, southern Warwickshire, northern Wiltshire and southern Worcestershire. There were also teams from Berkshire and one each from Greater London, Hampshire and Northamptonshire until the 2020–21 season.

History

The league was established in 1953. In the 2000–01 season, the Hellenic League absorbed the Chiltonian League.  The league now has a Premier Division and Division One as part of the National League System. The league also runs Division Two East, Division Two West, Division Two North and Division Two South below the National League System.  In the 2006–07 season the Hellenic League absorbed the Banbury District and Lord Jersey FA Veterans League with three Divisions now under the Hellenic Veterans League title.

Starting with the 2004–05 re-organisation the Hellenic League became a step 5 and 6 league in the National League System. Premier Division clubs play at Step 5 level, which offers progression to the Southern Football League Division One (Step 4) for Premier Division winners who have the required ground status.

Hellenic League Division One teams play at Step 6 level, promotion to the Step 5 Premier Division can be gained by clubs finishing in the top two of Division One dependent on required ground facilities as specified by The Football Association. Acceptance to HL Division One is offered to teams playing in the various Step 7 county leagues of the related Hellenic League area.

38 teams play in the Hellenic Premier and Division One. 18 teams play at Veterans level (players aged 35 or over).

Champions

The league started with only a Premier Division, before Division One was added in 1956.

For the 1971–72 season, Division One was split into Division One A and B.

The following season, Division One A and B were merged and a Division Two was created.

The following season, Division One and Division Two were merged.

In 2000, the league absorbed the Chiltonian League and Division One was regionalised into East and West.

In 2021, Division One East and West were merged again.

Cup winners
The Hellenic League football cups are the Supplementary Cup and the Challenge Cup. The Floodlit Cup existed until 2018–19.

References

External links
Hellenic Football League Official Website

 
1953 establishments in England
9
Sports leagues established in 1953